Geet Ramayan is a collection of 56 Marathi language songs chronologically describing events from the Indian Hindu epic, the Ramayana. It was broadcast by All India Radio, Pune in 1955–1956, four years before television was introduced in India. Written by G. D. Madgulkar and the songs being composed by Sudhir Phadke, Geet Ramayan was acclaimed for its lyrics, music and singing. It is considered a "milestone of Marathi light music" and the "most popular" Marathi version of Ramayana.

The team of Madgulkar and Phadke presented a new song every week for a year with every song being aired first on a Friday morning and then again on Saturday and Sunday morning, between 8:45 AM and 9:00 AM IST. The program's first song "Kuśa Lava Rāmāyaṇ Gātī" was aired on 1 April 1955. Though Geet Ramayan is based on sage Valmiki's epic Ramayana, Madgulkar chose a different narrative format and was praised for the lyrics, and was called Ādhunik Valmiki (the modern Valmiki). The Geet Ramayan is considered as "the crescendo of Madgulkar's literary vigour". Phadke mainly used ragas of Hindustani classical music to compose the songs. He also selected the raga and the Tāla of a song to suit the time of the incident and the narrative mood. The poet and composer were praised for their contribution to the series.

The series showcased a total of 32 various characters from Ramayana. Rama (avatar of Vishnu and hero of the Ramayana) being the lead character of the series was given maximum number of songs (10), followed by eight songs for Sita (Rama's wife and avatar of the Hindu goddess Lakshmi). Madgulkar expressed their various moods, ranging from their divinity to the human weaknesses. Incidentally, the central antagonist of the Ramayana and Geet Ramayan, the demon-king Ravana, was not given any song. The series is narrated by Kusha and Lava, twin sons of Rama and Sita, and the writer of Ramayana (Valmiki) was also given one song in the series.

With increasing popularity since its release, Geet Ramayan has been translated into nine other languages: five Hindi translations and one each in Bengali, English, Gujarati, Kannada, Konkani, Sanskrit, Sindhi and Telugu. It has also been transliterated into Braille.

Concept

Geet Ramayan was conceptualized in 1955, four years before the introduction of television in India in 1959. During the early days of All India Radio, Pune (also known as Aakashwani Pune), station director Sitakant Lad wanted to begin a radio programme which would be entertaining and provide moral education. He hence outlined his plan to poet and writer G. D. Madgulkar (popularly known as "Ga-Di-Ma"). Since the Ramayana (written by Valmiki) is an Indian epic, Lad and Madgulkar came up with an idea of a version in singable verse. Madgulkar accepted the challenge, enlisting his music-director friend Sudhir Phadke (popularly known as "Babuji") for the collaboration.

The team of Madgulkar and Phadke would present a new song every week for a year. Every song would be aired first on a Friday morning and then again on Saturday and Sunday morning, between 8:45 am and 9:00am IST. The programme was initially planned for a year (with 52 songs) with the concluding song Trīvār Jayajayakār Rāmā where Rama becomes the King, but 1955 in the Hindu calendar had an extra month (Adhikmās); therefore, four songs were added to extend the series to a total of fifty-six. The series ended with the song "Gā Bāḷāno, Shrīrāmāyaṇ" where the part post crown ceremony was added. Apart from the number of songs, Madgulkar and Phadke left music, lyrics and choice of singers ad libitum. Madgulkar was given artistic liberty for the choice of the meters for the song, execution of the story line, and the message he could convey through it.

Initially, the programme was scheduled to begin on the occasion of Gudi Padwa, beginning of the New year according to the lunisolar Hindu calendar but later finalized to be Rama Navami, traditional birthday of Rama. The program's first song "Kuśa Lava Rāmāyaṇ Gātī" was aired on 1 April 1955 at 8:45 am IST. Vidya Madgulkar, the poet's wife, recalled in an interview that Madgulkar wrote the first song and gave it to Phadke the day before the recording; however, Phadke lost the lyrics. With the broadcast already scheduled, station director Sitakant Lad requested Madgulkar to re-write the song which was readily declined by an angered poet. Lad then decided to lock the poet in one of recording rooms equipped with all the required writing material and agreed to unlock the door only when Madgulkar is ready with the lyrics. Madgulkar then rewrote the lyrics from memory in fifteen minutes so Phadke could compose the music.

Lyrics

Though Valmiki was the main inspiration for the Geet Ramayan, Madgulkar chose a different narrative format. He used a simple lyrical format with a flexible number of stanzas (from five to eleven stanzas, with three or four lines of varying length). The metre used was similar to Bhavageete, with roughly the same number of mātrās in each line. The metre was also suited to the narration and the characters who sang the song. Madgulkar used various formats, including narrative, descriptive and communal songs. He was praised for his lyrics, and was called "Ādhunik Valmiki" (the modern Valmiki); and the Geet Ramayan is considered "the crescendo of Madgulkar's literary vigour".

Madgulkar's narrative format was different from that of Valmiki's where he did not end the series with the coronation of Rama and Sita, but included Sita's abandonment by Rama, and her giving birth to the twins, Lava and Kusha. However, he chose not to include the last episode of Sita's final confrontation in Rama's court and her entering the earth. Madgulkar ended the series with the song "Gā Bāḷāno, Shrīrāmāyaṇ" which was voiced by Valmiki where he tells his disciples, Lava and Kusha, how they should recite the Ramayana in front of Rama. Evidently, this also completes the cycle of songs where it had begun, with Lava and Kusha singing in Rama's court.

Madgulkar did not make any attempt to provide new interpretation or meaning to the Ramayana but told the same story in the simpler and poetic format. With inclusion of characters like Ahalya and Shabari, he included the sentiments of religious devotion (Bhakti) and also gave divine touch to the story while describing the marriage of Sita and Rama as a union of Maya and Brahman. He composed songs on all seven chapters or Kāṇḍa of Ramayana. Out of 56 songs, poet composed twelve songs on Balakanda, seven on Ayodhya Kanda, fourteen on Aranya Kanda, three on Kishkindha Kanda, four on Sundara Kanda, twelve on Yuddha Kanda and three on Uttara Kanda.

As the series became popular, the daily newspapers in Pune began to print the text of the new song every week after its first airing. The first official edition of the text of these fifty-six poems and their prose narrations came out on the occasion of Vijayadashami, 3 October 1957, published for Akashwani by the director of the Publications Division, Delhi, in pocketbook size.

Music and singing
Musical director Sudhir Phadke composed the songs based on the ragas of Hindustani classical music, including Bhopali, Bhimpalasi and Madhuvanti. The raga and Tāla of a song was selected to suit the time of the incident and the narrative mood. For example, the song "Calā Rāghavā Calā" is composed as a Bibhas (morning) raga, and the song describes an event taking place in the morning. The songs "Āj Mī Śāpmucta Jāhale" and "Yāckā, Thāmbu Nako Dārāta" are not based on a specific raga, but include several ragas in each song.

The singers, which included Vasantrao Deshpande, Manik Varma, Suresh Haldankar, Ram Phatak and Lata Mangeshkar, were familiar with the vocal style of Indian classical music. Phadke voiced all the songs for Rama, and well-known Kirana gharana singer Manik Varma voiced the character of Sita. Lata Mangeshkar sang one song for Sita, "Maj Sāng Lakṣmaṇā", in which Sita questions Rama about her abandonment but her question remains unanswered.

Characters

A total of 32 characters from the Ramayana were voiced in the Geet Ramayan. Madgulkar expressed the emotions of characters such as Rama, Sita, Hanuman – the monkey (vanara) god and devotee of Rama – and Lakshmana (Rama's brother); he also attempted to give voice to the humblest characters in the epic. The vanara are given a song ("Setū Bāndhā Re Sāgarī") describing a bridge forming over the ocean so Rama and his army could cross to Lanka. The poet noted that the song described the sacrifice of joint labour and was an example of the principle, "Union is strength". Nishadraj Guha (King of Kevati, kingdom located by the banks of Ganges river) and the boatmen who helped Rama in crossing the Ganges river expressed themselves in "Nakos Nauke Parat Phirū". The author of the Ramayana, Valmiki, was also given a song (the final song, "Gā Bāḷāno, Shrīrāmāyaṇ") with his advice to Rama's sons Kusha and Lava before they appear before Rama.

Being hero of the Ramayana and Geet Ramayan, Madgulkar expressed the varied moods of Rama; he was the most-voiced character in the Geet Ramayan with ten songs, followed by Sita with eight. He portrayed Rama as a complex character full of emotions and passions, with some of the questionable deeds, yet bound by a traditional virtue and the sanctity of a promise. Madgulkar voiced Rama's personal ethical dilemmas (in "Vālīvadh Nā, Khalnidrālan" and "Līnate, Cārūte, Sīte") along with his courage (in "Nabhā Bhedunī Nād Chālale"), and steadfastness (in "Līnate, Cārūte, Sīte"). He was shown to be patient with his brothers and mothers (in "Parādhīn Āhe Jagatī Putra Mānavāchā"), obedient of father and sages (in "Calā Rāghavā Calā"), heroic on the battlefield, and diplomatic when dealing with the monkey king, Vali (in "Vālīvadh Nā, Khalnidrālan"). Madgulkar is said to have successfully shown Rama's divinity alongside his human weaknesses. He was shown to be distracted at the loss Sita (in "Koṭhe Sītā Janakanandinī?"), and wailed in Lakshmana's presence (in "Hī Ticyā Veṇitil Phule"). In another situation, he uttered some heart-wrenching words to Sita, in front of his army with blaming her for all the happenings (in "Līnate, Cārūte, Sīte"), and then he was also shown to explain his behavior with oaths and confessions of loyalty to Sita (in "Lokasākṣa Shuddhī Jhālī").

Rama's mother, Kausalya, sang three songs; his brother Bharata, his father Dasharatha, Hanuman, Lakshmana, the demon Surpanakha (sister of Ravana), Rama's guru-sage Vishvamitra and Kusha-Lava have two songs each. The central antagonist of the Ramayana, the demon-king Ravana, was not given a song; his oppressive presence was expressed in prose narration, poetic descriptions and songs sung by the other characters (such as Ravana's demon brother Kumbhakarna in "Lankevar Kāḷ Kaṭhin ālā").

List of songs
{| class="wikitable plainrowheaders collapsible collapsed" style="width:100%"
! colspan="9" style="background-color:#E0E0E0"|List of songs (number, title, singer(s), raga, taal, air date, character(s) and length)
|-
! scope="col" style="width:5%;"|No
! scope="col" style="width:25%;"|Title
! scope="col" style="width:19%;"|Singer(s)
! scope="col" style="width:14%;"|Raga
! scope="col" style="width:7%;"|Taal
! scope="col" style="width:10%;"|Aired On
! scope="col" style="width:10%;"|Character(s)
! scope="col" style="width:7%;"|Length
! scope="col" style="width:3%;" class="unsortable"|Ref
|-
| style="text-align:center;"|
! scope="row"|"Kuśa Lava Rāmāyaṇ Gātī""कुश लव रामायण गाती"
| Sudhir Phadke
| Bhopali
| Bhajani
| 
| Narrator
| 
| 
|-
| style="text-align:center;"|
! scope="row"|"Sarayū Tīrāvarī Ayodhyā""सरयू तीरावरी अयोध्या"
| Mandakini PandeyPramodini Desai
| 
| Bhajani
| 
| KushaLava
| 
| 
|-
| style="text-align:center;"|
! scope="row"|"Ugā Kā Kālij Mājhe Ule?""उगा कां काळिज माझें उले?"
| Lalita Phadke
| 
| Keherwa
| 
| Kausalya
| 
| 
|-
| style="text-align:center;"|
! scope="row"|"Udās Kā Tū?""उदास कां तूं?"
| Baban Navdikar
| Desh
| Bhajani
| 
| Dasharatha
| 
| 
|-
| style="text-align:center;"|
! scope="row"|"Daśarathā, Ghe He Pāyasadān""दशरथा, घे हें पायसदान"
| Sudhir Phadke
| Bhimpalasi
| Bhajani
| 
| Agni
| 
| 
|-
| style="text-align:center;"|
! scope="row"|"Rām Janmalā Ga Sakhī""राम जन्मला ग सखी"
| Suman MateJanki IyerKalindi Keskar
| 
| Dadra
| 
| Chorus
| 
| 
|-
| style="text-align:center;"|
! scope="row"|"Sāvaḷā Ga Rāmcandra""सांवळा ग रामचंद्र"
| Lalita Phadke
| 
| Keherwa
| 
| Kausalya
| 
| 
|-
| style="text-align:center;"|
! scope="row"|"Jyeṣṭha Tujhā Putra Malā""ज्येष्ठ तुझा पुत्र मला देइ दशरथा"
| Ram Phatak
| Puriya Dhanashree
| Ektal
| 
| Vishvamitra
| 
| 
|-
| style="text-align:center;"|
! scope="row"|"Mār Hī Trātikā Rāmcandrā""मार ही त्राटिका, रामचंद्रा"
| Ram Phatak
| Shankara
| Jhaptal
| 
| Vishvamitra
| 
| 
|-
| style="text-align:center;"|
! scope="row"|"Calā Rāghavā Calā""चला राघवा चला"
| Chandrakant Gokhale
| Bibhas
| Bhajani
| 
| Rishi
| 
| 
|-
| style="text-align:center;"|
! scope="row"|"Āj Mī Śāpmucta Jāhale" "आज मी शापमुक्त जाहलें"
| Malati Pandey
| 
| Keherwa
| 
| Ahalya
| 
| 
|-
| style="text-align:center;" |
! scope="row"|"Svayamvar Jhāle Sītece""स्वयंवर झालें सीतेचे"
| Sudhir Phadke
| 
| Keherwa
| 
|Charan
| 
| 
|-
| style="text-align:center;"|
! scope="row"|"Vhāyace Rām Āyodhyāpati""व्हायचे राम आयोध्यापति"
| Suman MateUsha AtreJanaki IyerYogini JoglekarMrs. Jog
| 
| Keherwa
| 
| UrmilaMandaviShrutakirtiChorus
| 
| 
|-
| style="text-align:center;"|
! scope="row"|"Modu Nakā Vacanās""मोडुं नका वचनास"
| Kumidini Pednekar
| Bihag
| Tintal
| 
| Kaikeyi
| 
| 
|-
| style="text-align:center;"|
! scope="row"|"Nako Re Jāu Rāmarāyā""नको रे जाउं रामराया"
| Lalita Phadke
| 
| Keherwa
| 
| Kausalya
| 
| 
|-
| style="text-align:center;"|
! scope="row"|"Rāmāviṇ Rājyapadī Koṇ Baisato?""रामाविण राज्यपदीं कोण बैसतो?"
| Suresh Haldankar
| 
| Ektal
| 
| Lakshmana
| 
| 
|-
| style="text-align:center;"|
! scope="row"|"Jethe Rāghav Tethe Sītā""जेथें राघव तेथें सीता"
| Manik Varma
| Madhuvanti
| Keherwa
| 
| Sita
| 
| 
|-
| style="text-align:center;"|
! scope="row"|"Thāmb Sumantā, Thāmbavi Re Rath""थांब सुमंता, थांबवि रे रथ"{{hidden|expanded=no|headerstyle=text-align:left;background-color:#E0E0E0;|Description:|Seeing Rama leave Ayodhya with his wife and brother, the residents beg him to stay. They ask Sumanta, the minister of Ayodhya who is driving the chariot, to stop. They follow Rama to the Ganga River.}}
| Chorus
| Todi
| Keherwa
| 
| Chorus
| 
| 
|-
| style="text-align:center;"|
! scope="row"|"Nakos Nauke Parat Phirū""नकोस नौके परत फिरूं"
| Chorus
| 
| Keherwa
| 
| Nishadraj GuhaBoatman
| 
| 
|-
| style="text-align:center;"|
! scope="row"|"Yā Ithe, Lakṣmaṇā, Bāndh Kutī""या इथें, लक्ष्मणा, बांध कुटी"
| Sudhir Phadke
| 
| Keherwa
| 
| Rama
| 
| 
|-
| style="text-align:center;"|
! scope="row"|"Bolale Ituke Maj Shrīrām""बोलले इतुके मज श्रीराम"
| Gajanan Watave
| Jogkans
| Keherwa
| 
| Sumant
| 
| 
|-
| style="text-align:center;"|
! scope="row"|"Dāṭalā Cohikade Andhār""दाटला चोहिकडे अंधार"
| Sudhir Phadke
| 
| Keherwa
| 
| Dasharatha
| 
| 
|-
| style="text-align:center;"|
! scope="row"|"Mātā Na Tū, Vairiṇī""माता न तूं, वैरिणी"
| Vasantrao Deshpande
| Adana
| Tintal
| 
| Bharata
| 
| 
|-
| style="text-align:center;"|
! scope="row"|"Cāpabāṇ Ghyā Karī""चापबाण घ्या करीं"
| Suresh Haldankar
| Kedar
| Ektal
| 
| Lakshmana
| 
| 
|-
| style="text-align:center;"|
! scope="row"|"Parādhīn Āhe Jagatī Putra Mānavāchā""पराधीन आहे जगतीं पुत्र मानवाचा"
| Sudhir Phadke
| Yaman Kalyan
| Keherwa
| 
| Rama
| 
| 
|-
| style="text-align:center;"|
! scope="row"|"Tāt Gele, Māya Gelī""तात गेले, माय गेली"
| Vasantrao Deshpande
| Puriya Dhanashree
| Rupak
| 
| Bharata
| 
| 
|-
| style="text-align:center;"|
! scope="row"|"Koṇ Tū, Kuṭhalā Rājakumār?""कोण तूं कुठला राजकुमार?"
| Malati Pandey
| 
| Keherwa
| 
| Surpanakha
| 
| 
|-
| style="text-align:center;"|
! scope="row"|"Sūḍ Ghe Tyācā Lankāpati""सूड घे त्याचा लंकापति"
| Yogini Joglekar
| 
| Tintal
| 
| Surpanakha
| 
| 
|-
| style="text-align:center;"|
! scope="row"|"Maj Āṇun Dyā To""मज आणुन द्या तो"
| Manik Varma
| 
| Keherwa
| 
| Sita
| 
| 
|-
| style="text-align:center;"|
! scope="row"|"Yāckā, Thāmbu Nako Dārāta" "याचका, थांबु नको दारात"
| Manik Varma
| 
| Keherwa
| 
| Sita
| 
| 
|-
| style="text-align:center;"|
! scope="row"|"Koṭhe Sītā Janakanandinī?""कोठें सीता जनकनंदिनी?"
| Sudhir Phadke
| 
| Keherwa
| 
| Rama
| 
| 
|-
| style="text-align:center;"|
! scope="row"|"Hī Ticyā Veṇitil Phule""हीं तिच्या वेणिंतिल फुलें"
| Sudhir Phadke
| Bhairavi
| Keherwa
| 
| Rama
| 
| 
|-
| style="text-align:center;"|
! scope="row"|"Palavilī Rāvaṇe Sītā""पळविली रावणें सीता"
| Ram Phatak
| 
| Keherwa
| 
| Jatayu
| 
| 
|-
| style="text-align:center;"|
! scope="row"|"Dhanya Mī Śabarī Shrīrāmā""धन्य मी शबरी श्रीरामा"
| Malati Pandey
| 
| Bhajani
| 
| Shabari
| 
| 
|-
| style="text-align:center;"|
! scope="row"|"Sanmitra Rāghavānchā Sugrīv Aāj Jhālā""सन्मित्र राघवांचा सुग्रीव आज झाला"
| V. L. Inamdar
| Brindabani Sarang
| Ektal
| 
| Sugriva
| 
| 
|-
| style="text-align:center;"|
! scope="row"|"Vālīvadh Nā, Khalnidrālan""वालीवध ना, खलनिर्दालन"
| Sudhir Phadke
| Kedar
| Keherwa
| 
| Rama
| 
| 
|-
| style="text-align:center;"|
! scope="row"|"Asā Hā Ekaca Shrīhanumān""असा हा एकच श्रीहनुमान्"
| Vasantrao Deshpande
| Multani
| Bhajani
| 
| Jambavan
| 
| 
|-
| style="text-align:center;"|
! scope="row"|"Hīca Tī Rāmāchī Swāminī""हीच ती रामांची स्वामिनी"
| V. L. Inamdar
| Tilang
| Keherwa
| 
| Hanuman
| 
| 
|-
| style="text-align:center;"|
! scope="row"|"Nako Karūs Valganā""नको करूंस वल्गना"
| Manik Varma
| Shankara
| Ektal
| 
| Sita
| 
| 
|-
| style="text-align:center;"|
! scope="row"|"Maj Sāng Avasthā Dūtā""मज सांग अवस्था दूता"
| Manik Varma
| Bhimpalasi
| Keherwa
| 
| Sita
| 
| 
|-
| style="text-align:center;"|
! scope="row"|"Peṭavi Lankā Hanumant""पेटवी लंका हनुमंत"
| Mandakini PandeyPramodini Joshi
| Malkaush
| Keherwa
| 
| KushaLava
| 
| 
|-
| style="text-align:center;"|
! scope="row"|"Setū Bāndhā Re Sāgarī""सेतू बांधा रे सागरीं"
| Chorus
| 
| Keherwa
| 
| Vanaras
| 
| 
|-
| style="text-align:center;"|
! scope="row"|"Raghuvarā, Bolat Kā Nāhī""रघुवरा, बोलत कां नाहीं?"
| Manik Varma
| 
| Keherwa
| 
| Sita
| 
| 
|-
| style="text-align:center;"|
! scope="row"|"Sugrīvā He Sāhas Asale""सुग्रीवा, हें साहस असलें"
| Sudhir Phadke
| 
| Keherwa
| 
| Rama
| 
| 
|-
| style="text-align:center;"|
! scope="row"|"Rāvaṇās Sāng Angadā""रावणास सांग अंगदा"
| Sudhir Phadke
| Sarang
| Ektal
| 
| Rama
| 
| 
|-
| style="text-align:center;"|
! scope="row"|"Nabhā Bhedunī Nād Chālale""नभा भेदुनी नाद चालले"
| Mandakini PandeyPramodini Joshi
| Bhairavi
| Keherwa
| 
| KushaLava
| 
| 
|-
| style="text-align:center;"|
! scope="row"|"Lankevar Kāḷ Kaṭhin""लंकेवर काळ कठिण"
| V. L. Inamdar
| Hindol
| Khemta
| 
| Kumbhakarna
| 
| 
|-
| style="text-align:center;"|
! scope="row"|"Āj Kā Niṣphaḷ Hotī Bāṇ""आज कां निष्फळ होती बाण?"
| Sudhir Phadke
| 
| Keherwa
| 
| Rama
| 
| 
|-
| style="text-align:center;"|
! scope="row"|"Bhūvarī Rāvaṇvadha Jhālā""भूवरी रावणवध झाला"
| Chorus
| 
| Bhajani
| 
| GandharvaApsara
| 
| 
|-
| style="text-align:center;"|
! scope="row"|"Līnate, Cārūte, Sīte""लीनते, चारुते, सीते"
| Sudhir Phadke
| Yamani Bilaval
| Keherwa
| 
| Rama
| 
| 
|-
| style="text-align:center;"|
! scope="row"|"Lokasākṣa Shuddhī Jhālī""लोकसाक्ष शुद्धी झाली"
| Sudhir Phadke
| 
| Bhajani
| 
| Rama
| 
| 
|-
| style="text-align:center;"|
! scope="row"|"Trīvār Jayajayakār Rāmā""त्रिवार जयजयकार, रामा"
| Chorus
| Bhairavi
| Bhajani
| 
| Chorus
| 
| 
|-
| style="text-align:center;"|
! scope="row"|"Prabho, Maj Ekac Var Dyāvā""प्रभो, मज एकच वर द्यावा"
| Ram Phatak
| 
| Bhajani
| 
| Hanuman
| 
| 
|-
| style="text-align:center;"|
! scope="row"|"Dohāḷe Puravā Raghukulatilakā""डोहाळे पुरवा रघुकुलतिलका"
| Manik Varma
| 
| Keherwa
| 
| Sita
| 
| 
|-
| style="text-align:center;"|
! scope="row"|"Maj Sāng Lakṣmaṇā""मज सांग लक्ष्मणा"
| Lata Mangeshkar
| 
| Keherwa
| 
| Sita
| 
| 
|-
| style="text-align:center;"|
! scope="row"|"Gā Bāḷāno, Shrīrāmāyaṇ""गा बाळांनो, श्रीरामायण"
| Sudhir Phadke
| Bhairavi
| Bhajani
| 
| Valmiki
| 
| 
|-
| align="right" colspan="7" | Total
| bgcolor="#E0E0E0" align="right" | 7:35:42
| 
|-
| align="right" | 
! scope="row" | Independent composition
| colspan="7" |
|}

Performances
After Geet Ramayan's original broadcast was over in March of 1956, requests of re-broadcast were flooding the radio station. All-India Radio repeated the entire series of fifty-six weekly songs due to popular demand. After the broadcast, Phadke produced public concerts of selected songs. The first public performance was held in the Madgulkars' bungalow, "Panchavati" at Wakdewadi, Pune on 28 May 1958. In 1979, a Silver Jubilee celebration of the programme took place at the New English School in Pune for eight nights. Atal Bihari Vajpayee, the then Minister of External Affairs, attended the show as the guest of honour along with the then Deputy Prime Minister of India Yashwantrao Chavan, Bollywood film director Basu Bhattacharya, actor Dada Kondke, and celebrated classical singers such as Bhimsen Joshi and Kishori Amonkar. Vajpayee also attended the Golden Jubilee celebration with Sharad Pawar and Bal Thackeray. National Award-winning art director Nitin Chandrakant Desai designed the stage depicting scenes from the Ramayana. The event featured all the songs from the original Geet Ramayan now vocalized by Madgulkar's son Anand Madgulkar, Shridhar Phadke, Suresh Wadkar, Upendra Bhat, Padmaja Phenany Joglekar and others.

Reception
As the radio programme became popular, daily newspapers in Pune began printing the lyrics of the new songs each week. The publication department of All India Radio also compiled the lyrics and excerpts from the introductory comments in a book form. The 179-page volume, then priced at  2, was launched on 3 October 1957 on the occasion of Vijayadashami. In 1965, the HMV released ten LPs featuring the voice of Sudhir Phadke. In 1968, the Gramophone Company of India released a 10-cassette set, again featuring Phadke's voice, and 50,000 records were sold. Madgulkar's son, Anand, produced a televised version showcasing twenty-eight episodes of the Geet Ramayan on Zee Marathi; however, it received a lukewarm response. He has also written a book, Geet Ramayanache Ramayan, describing the making of the radio programme. Live shows of Geet Ramayan are still produced on occasion of Rama Navami.Geet Ramayan'' has been translated into nine other languages and also transliterated into Braille. The translations are:

Bengali
 By Kamala Bhagwat, a performer from Calcutta

English
 By Mr. Ursekar, a retired judge who used a Shakespearean style

Gujarati
 By Hansraj Thakkar of Mumbai; sung by Hansraj Thakkar and Kumud Bhagwat

Hindi
 By Rudradatta Mishra of Gwalior, and published by Nagesh Joshi; sung by Vasant Ajgaonkar
 By Hari Narayan Vyas; sung by Bal Gokhle
 By Kusum Tambe of Mandla, Madhya Pradesh
 By an unknown singer from Nagpur, Avadhi
 By Bal Gokhale of Baroda

Kannada
 By B. H. Tofakhane; sung by Upendra Bhat

Konkani
 By Mr. Kamath; sung by Upendra Bhat
 By B.V. Baliga

Sanskrit
 By Vasant Gadgil; sung by Malati Pande, Kamala Ketkar and Sanjay Upadhye
 By Sitaram Datar of Andheri, Thane sung by Milind Karmarkar, Madhuri Karmarkar and Sudha Datar

Sindhi
 By poet and singer Rita Shahani, who performed the songs as classical ragas. Also, choreographed and directed a dance-drama based on the book.

Telugu
 By Vanamamalai Varadacharya; sung by Dhondushastri and Shyamala Satyanarayan Rao

Footnotes

See also
Ramavataram

References

Bibliography

External links
 Geet Ramayana – Publications Division, Ministry of Information and Broadcasting, Government of India
 An English Translation of Geet Ramayana
 Official site of Ga. Di. Madgulkar – I
 Official site of Ga. Di. Madgulkar – II

Albums by Indian artists
Hindustani classical music albums
Indian poetry collections
Indian radio programmes
Marathi-language literature
Marathi music
Works based on the Ramayana
All India Radio